Various types of witchcraft and occult religious practices exist in Latin American and Afro-Caribbean cultures, known in Spanish as  (pronounced ). Influenced by indigenous religion, Catholicism, and European witchcraft,  the purpose may range from white magic to black magic.

Concept 
Across the Afro-Latin diaspora, many forms of spiritual practices have emerged: Haitian Vodou, Cuban Santería, and Brazilian Candomblé and Umbanda. What sets the witches of Latin America apart from their European counterparts is the blend of religiosity and spirituality. The witches in Latin America's ‘magic’ are rooted in African magic, European spiritualism, and Indigenous practices, making them practice an integrated version of spirituality. .

Isabelo Zenón Cruz made the assessment that Puerto Rican vernacular religions (and really any Afro-Latino religions) have been only studied by folklorists but not comparative religionists due to “classist and racist assumptions”.

Unlike many other Caribbean religions that derive from Africa, Brujería is not based on stable community, hierarchy, or membership. Instead, practices are more dependent on the ritual preferences of the actual participants. Because of the spontaneity of the spirits, it is impossible for institutionalized doctrines of worships to be enforced on followers and practicers of Brujería.

Within sacred altars of brujos, lessons of practitioners, and brujería rituals lie ties to African ideologies, Catholicism, and Spiritism; explaining the erasure of hierarchical order.

Before Spiritism was developed, Taíno Indians and enslaved African people in Latin America developed the convictions that there exist spirits and those spirits can be communicated with. This becomes mixed with the convictions of spiritual worship introduced by Catholic missionaries. Early leaders of Spiritism found interest in Brujería amongst liberal, emancipation minded groups in the late nineteenth century; begging the interest for further research of the correlation between politics and Brujería.

Origins 
In Latin America, in the 1500s, when the archbishop of Santo Domingo and fifth bishop of Puerto Rico, Nicolás Ramos, recorded his recollections of ‘black brujos [male and female] who engaged with the devil in the shape of a goat and, every night in front of this goat, cursed God, Santa María, and the sacraments of the Holy Church.’’ Ramos wrote, ‘‘[A]sserting that they did not have nor believe in a god other than that devil...they performed these rituals in some fields [apparently they were in a trance] ,...not in dreams since there were some people who saw them.’’ These people, Ramos continues, ‘‘tried to make them [the sorcerers] refrain from their doings through chanting and holy gifts [ dádivas ], and with all this [information they] came to me.’” This perpetual demonization of elements of African worship set up the forefront to the centuries of demonization of Brujería practices.

From the sixteenth to the subsequent eighteenth and nineteenth centuries, slaves were shipped from Africa to Puerto Rico and Hispaniola and were forced to convert to Christianity by the imposing church and the overseeing hacendados—land owners. Branded slaves were baptized to be fully recognized as the property of hacendados.

In the late 1800s to early 1900s during the early days of American occupation within Cuba, there were established attacks to undermine the legitimacy of several Afro-Cuban institutions and organizations— including Brujería.

With the growth of a single Cuban identity came a greater appreciation for conformity and deviation from “creolised manifestations”. However, the declination of faith-based practices in Cuba due to the rise in Marxism from 1959 to the 1990s lead to practitioners of Afro-Cuban religions to have to find innovative ways to survive Castro’s political informants that particularly called for the suppression of witchcraft and Brujería. 

The introduction of Spiritism in the twentieth century attracted more participants of all racial backgrounds. It also added new foundations of practice and ritualistic objects such as: santiguos (healing blessings), 19 despojos (spiritual cleansings), prayers, and spells; and an array of indigenous, medieval Catholic, and African offerings.

Modernization of Brujería 
The brujas inherited traits from Catholicism, and yet the Catholic Church had deemed them as evil and demonized them. In some places, their demonization has come to an end on this scale, and they are left as they are, but in others, brujas are forced to not practice their form of magic. That being said, with the increasing rate of persecution amongst practitioners since the colonization of the Afro-Latino Caribbean, Brujería has been forced into modernization to combat erasure.

As separatist ideals begin to gain more momentum, particularly in Puerto Rico, there becomes more clings to cultural nationalism— including clings to aspects of Afro-Boricua and Taíno folklore. Previously (1950s–1960s), journalists in the island denounced Brujería as a way to help “educate the masses”. However, the shift in cultural nationalism from the 1980s onwards now leads to media outlets uncovering “hidden traditions” of the “endangered Puerto Rican Hispanic, Taíno, and African traditions”

Romberg argues the practice of modern-day Brujería as "the vernacular co-optation of discourses of interest and passions, of consumerism and spirituality, commodity fetishism and morality, and welfare capitalism and magic". And also reveals that despite misconceptions, Brujería builds to social order through both “holistic or individualized types of intervention”  and endorsement of positive “mainstream social values”.

Practice 
Brujería doesn't participate in community, hierarchical, or initiation-based practice or membership. Rituals are interdependent on the procedures, practices, and attitudes passed down by its participants and heavily depend on forces of nature and the spontaneity of the spirits. Following specific guidelines and doctrines in Brujería is possible .

However, some commonalities include basic ritual gestures, communication during divination, possession, and specific components of altars. These similarities are often referred to as “a kind of spiritual lingua franca” which explains the ubiquity of the practice cross the Afro-Latino and Non-Afro-Latino diaspora.

In practice, brujos stress to not believe in the ritualistic objects or hold too much pertinence in the material representations of the spiritual entities, but rather focus on the messages and “powers of the entities that inhabit these icons” that are also used to summon  ancient demons.

Power is sensed and manifested when the voices of Spiritist entities, Santería orishas, and the recently deceased are brought on by “Brujería rituals, divination, trance and the making of magic works”. The spirits' abstract means of revelation include through emotions, through senses, and through healings as a means to transform the “emotional, proprioceptive and (to some extent) physiological states of participants”

Whereas a lot of focus within the practice of Brujería is on the technological systems, Brujería focuses mostly on interpersonal client-patient power that “emerges during healing, divination and magic rituals challenges the assumed precondition”; specifically in regards to health, labor, family relations, and even career management.

Brujos and practitioners of Brujería never question the spirits. The performative methods of surrender training is the only lesson brujos aim to teach. The expectation is to have faith in the spirits and the spirits will theatrically reveal what is meant to be shown.

See also
 Catalan mythology about witches
 Curandero
 Guayama Puerto Rico, "Pueblo de los Brujos" (city of witches).

References

Sources
 Ankarloo, B. & Clark, S, (2002) Witchcraft and Magic in Europe: the period of the witch trials
 Guiley, Rosemary Ellen (1989) The Encyclopedia of Witches and Witchcraft, New York: Facts-on-File.

Further reading
 Spence, L. (1994) The Magic and Mysteries of Mexico
 Christian, W.A., Jr. (1989) Local Religion in Sixteenth-Century Spain
 Henningsen, G. (1980) The Witches' Advocate: Basque Witchcraft and the Spanish Inquisition (1609-1614)
 Castaneda, C. (1968) The Teachings of Don Juan
 Romberg, Raquel (2002) "Witchcraft and Welfare: Spiritual Capital and the Business of Magic in Modern Puerto Rico"
 Chatwin, Bruce
 Kinnie, Ernest The Brujo....2-Act Play

American witchcraft
Latin American culture